Neil Donell (born May 23, 1956) is a Canadian singer who has worked extensively as a session musician and has been nominated for multiple Juno Awards. He has been the lead tenor vocalist for the classic rock band Chicago since 2018, succeeding Peter Cetera, Jason Scheff and Jeff Coffey.

Originally from Montreal, Quebec, Donell moved to Toronto in the mid-1980s and is still a resident of that city. He has a four-octave vocal range and has logged more than 10,000 sessions in his singing career. Donell's credits also include a few small acting roles and performing "Shining Time", with Maren Ord, for the 2000 motion picture Thomas and the Magic Railroad. Donell performed a new rendition of the song for Rainbow Sun Productions' video presentation commemorating the film's 20th anniversary, which premiered on YouTube on July 19, 2020.

References

External links 
 Neil Donell website
 

Living people
Canadian rock singers
Canadian tenors
Singers from Montreal
1962 births
Chicago (band) members